Deganwy Castle (Modern ) was an early stronghold of Gwynedd and lies in Deganwy at the mouth of the River Conwy in Conwy, north Wales. It lies at an elevation of 110 m (361 ft) on a  volcanic plug.

Details
The Early Middle Ages fortress, which is now little more than ditches and mounds, was made of wood and constructed on a massive rock outcrop in what is now the suburbs of modern-day Llandudno. Traditionally, it was the headquarters of Maelgwn Gwynedd, King of Gwynedd (fl. c. 520–547). A nearby hill is called Bryn Maelgwyn and other places in the locality are associated with him. An important coin hoard of 204 Silver Cnut pennies was found on Bryn Maelgwyn in July 1979.

Deganwy was probably first occupied during the Roman period, but was popular in the years following their departure because it was safe from Irish raids. The area beneath the rocky stronghold may have been the site of a settlement of serfs. The stronghold was burned down in 812 when it was struck by lightning.

By the thirteenth century, Deganwy was fortified by the prince of Wales Llywelyn ab Iorwerth. It was captured by the earl of Chester in 1210, but recaptured shortly afterward by Llywelyn, who had it refortified in stone.

In 1241, possession of the castle was taken by King Henry III of England, who embarked on an extensive building programme; the building work cost more than £2,200. The castle was destroyed by Llywelyn ap Gruffudd, Prince of Wales in 1263. In 1283, King Edward I of England had Conwy Castle constructed just across the estuary and he left Deganwy Castle in ruins.

Later history and investigation
Between 1961 and 1966 Leslie Alcock led excavations at Deganwy Castle. The programme of work was planned by the University of Wales and funded by the Board of Celtic Studies and the Caernarvonshire Historical Society.

During the excavations a dozen sherds of early medieval pottery which had been imported from the Mediterranean were discovered indicating the far-reaching contacts of Gwynedd's royal dynasty.

In 2009, the Gwynedd Archaeological Trust carried out a geophysical survey of the bailey between the two hills and land immediately north and south of the castle.

See also
 Castles in Great Britain and Ireland
 List of castles in Wales
 Dyserth Castle

References
Notes

Bibliography

External links 

3D Reconstruction of the castle in the 1250s
www.geograph.co.uk : photos of Deganwy Castle and surrounding area

Buildings and structures in Conwy
Castles in Conwy County Borough
Castle ruins in Wales
Sub-Roman Britain
Scheduled monuments in Wales
Grade II* listed castles in Wales
Grade II* listed buildings in Conwy County Borough